Labriformes is an order of ray-finned fishes which includes the wrasse, cales and parrotfishes, within the clade Percomorpha. Some authors include the Labroformes as the clade Labroidei within the Perciformes while others include more families within the Labriformes, such as the cichlids and damselfishes, but the 5th edition of Fishes of the World includes just three listed in the section below and includes 87 genera and about 630 species.

Families
The following three families are classified within the Labriformes:

 Labridae Cuvier, 1816 (Wrasse)
 Odacidae Günther 1861 (Cales)
 Scaridae Rafinesque, 1810 (Parrotfishes)

References

 
Percomorpha